The 1999 season was Shimizu S-Pulse's eighth season in existence and their seventh season in the J1 League. The club also competed in the Emperor's Cup and the J.League Cup. The team finished the season second in the league.

Competitions

Domestic results

J.League 1

Emperor's Cup

J.League Cup

Player statistics

Other pages
 J.League official site

Shimizu S-Pulse
Shimizu S-Pulse seasons